Enigmogramma admonens is a moth of the family Noctuidae first described by Francis Walker in 1858. It is found in Brazil, Cuba and Puerto Rico.

References

Moths described in 1858
Plusiinae